Scopula adenensis is a moth of the family Geometridae. It is found in Yemen, Saudi Arabia and Oman.

References

Moths described in 1986
adenensis
Moths of Asia